Butchers Hill is a book written by Laura Lippman and published by Avon Books (now owned by HarperCollins) on 1 July 1998 which later went on to win the Anthony Award for Best Paperback Original in 1999.

References 

Anthony Award-winning works
American mystery novels
1998 American novels
Avon (publisher) books